Ellen Litman (born 1973) is an American novelist. She received the Rona Jaffe Foundation Writers' Award in 2006.

Formative years
Born in Moscow, Russia, Litman emigrated with her parents in 1992 to Pittsburgh, Pennsylvania. She was educated at the University of Pittsburgh and earned a B.S. in Information Science.

For six years she worked as a software developer in Baltimore, Maryland and Boston, Massachusetts.

Literary career
During the fall of 1998, Litman began to formally study writing. She earned her Master of Fine Arts in Creative Writing in 2004 from Syracuse University. That same year, Litman was also chosen by the Wisconsin Institute for Creative Writing for one of its six fellowships, which ran between August and May in Madison, Wisconsin of that year. One of three fiction writers selected, she received a $25,000 stipend to support her writing.

In September 2006, newspapers reported that Litman was one of six emerging writers to receive the Rona Jaffe Foundation's Writers' Award, a $15,000 prize which is given annually to "women writers who demonstrate excellence and promise in the early stages of their careers."

As of 2023, Litman is an associate professor and associate director of the Creative Writing Program at the University of Connecticut.

Works
 The Last Chicken in America: A Novel in Stories, (New York: W.W. Norton, 2007)

References

Sources
Contemporary Authors Online. The Gale Group, 2007. PEN (Permanent Entry Number):  0000162696.

External links
 Ellen Litman (official author's page), Penguin Random House.

1973 births
Living people
21st-century American novelists
American women novelists
Writers from Pittsburgh
University of Pittsburgh alumni
American people of Russian-Jewish descent
Russian Jews
Jewish American novelists
21st-century American women writers
Rona Jaffe Foundation Writers' Award winners
Novelists from Pennsylvania
Russian emigrants to the United States
21st-century American Jews